The 2012 British Speedway Championship was the 52nd edition of the British Speedway Championship. The Final took place on 30 July at Monmore Green in Wolverhampton, England. The Championship was won by defending champion Scott Nicholls, who beat Chris Harris, Tai Woffinden and Edward Kennett in the final heat. It was the seventh time Nicholls had won the title, making him the most successful rider in the history of the competition.

Results

The Final 
  Monmore Green Stadium, Wolverhampton
 30 July 2012

See also 
 British Speedway Championship

References 

British Speedway Championship
Great Britain